A gay village is a geographical area with generally recognized boundaries that is inhabited or frequented by many lesbian, gay, bisexual, transgender, and queer (LGBT) people. Gay villages often contain a number of gay-oriented establishments, such as gay bars and pubs, nightclubs, bathhouses, restaurants, boutiques, and bookstores.

Among the most famous gay villages are New York City's Greenwich Village, Hell's Kitchen, and Chelsea neighborhoods in Manhattan; Fire Island and The Hamptons on Long Island; Asbury Park, Lambertville, and Maplewood in New Jersey; Boston's South End, Jamaica Plain, and Provincetown, Massachusetts; Philadelphia's Gayborhood; Washington D.C.'s Dupont Circle; Midtown Atlanta; Chicago's Boystown; London's Soho, Birmingham's Gay Village, Brighton's Kemptown, and Manchester's Canal Street, all in England; Los Angeles County's West Hollywood; as well as Barcelona Province's Sitges, Toronto's Church and Wellesley neighborhood, the Castro of San Francisco; Madrid's Chueca; Sydney's Newtown and Darlinghurst; Berlin's Schöneberg; the Gay Street in Rome, Le Marais in Paris; Green Point in Cape Town; Melville in Johannesburg; and Zona Rosa in Mexico City.

Such areas may represent an LGBT-friendly oasis in an otherwise hostile city or may simply have a high concentration of gay residents and businesses. Some areas are often associated with being "gay" cities or resorts, due to their image and acceptance of the gay community. Examples include Provincetown; Lower Manhattan; San Francisco; Saugatuck, Michigan; Manchester; Brighton; Sydney; Cape Town; and the Greek island of Mykonos.

Much as other urbanized groups, some LGBT people have managed to utilize their spaces as a way to reflect their cultural value and serve the special needs of individuals in relation to society at large. Today, these neighborhoods can typically be found in the upper-class areas of a given city, like in Manhattan, chosen for aesthetic or historic value, no longer resulting from the sociopolitical ostracization and the constant threat of physical violence from homophobic individuals that originally motivated these communities to live together for their mutual safety.

These neighborhoods are also often found in working-class parts of the city or in the neglected fringe of a downtown area communities which may have been upscale historically but became economically depressed and socially disorganized. In these cases, the establishment of an LGBT community has turned some of these areas into more expensive neighborhoods, a process known as gentrification a phenomenon in which LGBT people often play a pioneer role. This process does not always work out to the benefit of these communities, as they often see property values rise so high that they can no longer afford them, as high-rise condominiums are built and bars move out, or the only LGBT establishments that remain are those catering to a more upscale clientele. However, today's manifestations of "queer ghettos" bear little resemblance to those of the 1970s.

The ghetto
The term ghetto originally referred to those places in European cities, where Jews were required to live according to local law. During the 20th century, ghetto came to be used to describe the areas inhabited by a variety of groups that mainstream society deemed outside the norm, including not only Jews but poor people, LGBT people, ethnic minorities, hobos, prostitutes, and bohemians.

These neighborhoods, which often arise from crowded, highly dense, and often deteriorated inner city districts, are critical sites where members of gender and sexual minorities have traditionally congregated. From one perspective, these spaces are places of marginality created by an often homophobic, biphobic, and transphobic heterosexual community; from another perspective, they are places of refuge where members of gender and sexual minorities can benefit from the concentration of safe, nondiscriminatory resources and services (just as other minorities do).

In some cities, LGBT people congregate in visibly identified neighborhoods, while in others, they are dispersed in neighborhoods, which have less visibility, because a liberal, affirming counterculture is present. For example, LGBT people in San Francisco congregate in the Castro neighborhood, while LGBT people in Seattle concentrate in the city's older bohemian stomping grounds of Capitol Hill, and those of Montreal have concentrated in a working-class neighborhood referred to administratively as "Centre-Sud" but largely known as "Le Village". These areas, however, have higher concentrations of LGBT residents and businesses that cater to them than do surrounding neighborhoods. Some cities, like Austin, Texas, have not developed a defined gay village despite the city of Austin being home to many LGBT people with developed LGBT-friendly businesses and a counterculture present.

History

The neighbourhood of Schöneberg in Berlin was the first gay village in the world, developing in the 1920s. Prior to the 1960s and 1970s, specialized LGBT communities did not exist as gay villages in the United States; bars were usually where LGBT social networks developed, and they were located in certain urban areas where police zoning would implicitly allow so-called "deviant entertainment" under close surveillance. In New York, for example, the congregation of gay men had not been illegal since 1965; however, no openly gay bar had been granted a license to serve alcohol. The police raid of a private gay club called the Stonewall Inn on June 27, 1969 led to a series of minor disturbances in the neighborhood of the bar over the course of the subsequent three days and involving more than 1,000 people. The Stonewall Rebellion managed to change not only the profile of the gay community but the dynamic within the community itself. This, along with several other similar incidents, precipitated the appearance of gay ghettos throughout North America, as spatial organization shifted from bars and street-cruising to specific neighborhoods. This transition "from the bars to the streets, from nightlife to daytime, from 'sexual deviance' to an alternative lifestyle" was the critical moment in the development of the gay community. On June 23, 2015, the Stonewall Inn was the first landmark in New York City to be recognized by the New York City Landmarks Preservation Commission on the basis of its status in LGBT history, and on June 24, 2016, the Stonewall National Monument was named the first US National Monument dedicated to the LGBT-rights movement.

Online communities had developed globally by the early 2000s as a resource connecting gay villagers worldwide to provide information for arts, travel, business, gay counseling, and legal services, aiming to provide safe and gay-friendly environments for members of LGBT communities in general.

Characteristics
Gay villages can vary widely from city to city and country to country. Furthermore, some large cities also develop "satellite" gay villages that are essentially "overflow" areas. In such cases, gay men and lesbians have become priced-out of the main gay village and move to other, more affordable areas, thereby creating an entirely new gay village, also thereby furthering the process of gentrification by pricing-out long held tenants of these areas. In New York City, many gays in the 1990s moved to the Chelsea neighborhood from the Greenwich Village neighborhood as a less expensive alternative; subsequent to this movement, house prices in Chelsea have increased dramatically to rival the West Village within Greenwich Village itself. Similarly, gentrification is dramatically changing Philadelphia's Gayborhood, and the city's LGBT community is expanding across the city. Other examples include, in Boston, gay men moving to the South End and lesbians migrating to Jamaica Plain; while in Chicago, gays have moved to the Andersonville area as an offshoot of the Boystown/Lakeview neighborhood. Some gay villages are not neighborhoods at all, but instead are entirely separate municipalities from the city for which they serve as the primary gay enclave, such as West Hollywood in the Los Angeles area, and Wilton Manors in the Miami/Fort Lauderdale area.

These processes are tied to the spatial nature of the urban renaissance which was occurring at the time. The "first wave" of low-wage gay residences in these urban centers paved the way for other, more affluent gay professionals to move into the neighborhoods; this wealthier group played a significant role in the gentrification of many inner city neighborhoods. The presence of gay men in the real estate industry of San Francisco was a major factor facilitating the urban renaissance of the city in the 1970s.

However, the gentrification of gay villages may also serve to reinforce stereotypes of gays, by pushing out gay people who do not conform to the prevailing "gay, white, affluent, professional" image. Such people (including gay people of color, low-income/working-class gays, and "undesirable" groups such as gay prostitutes and leathermen) are usually forced out of the "village" due to rising rents or constant harassment at the hands of an increased policing presence. Especially in San Francisco's Polk Gulch neighborhood (the first "gay village" in that city), gentrification seems to have had this result.

Gay men and women have a reputation for driving the revitalization of previously run-down enclaves. Making these neighborhoods more desirable places to live, businesses and other classes of people move to the area and, accordingly, property values tend to go up. Richard Florida, an influential American academic, claims that their mere presence lures investors and jobs, particularly of the high-technology kind. They are, he says, "the canaries of the creative economy". Cities that have gay villages and are more tolerant towards gays, generally tend to have stronger, more robust, and creative economies, as compared to cities that are less tolerant towards gays. Florida says that cities as such have a stronger creative class, which is integral in bringing in new ideas that stimulate economies.

Consumerization

The gentrification of once rundown inner-city areas, coupled with the staging of pride parades in these areas, has resulted in the increased visibility of gay communities. Parades such as Sydney's Gay and Lesbian Mardi Gras and Manchester's Pride events attract significant investment and create tourist revenue, and cities have acknowledged that the acceptance of lesbian and gay culture has become a sign of urban "sophistication" and that gay-oriented events, such as pride parades and the Gay Games, are potentially lucrative events, attracting thousands of gay tourists and their dollars. The growing recognition of the economic value of the gay community is not only associated with their wealth but also with the role that lesbians and gay men have played (and continue to play) in urban revitalization.

List of gay villages

North America 
Provincetown, Massachusetts, was ranked by the US Census Bureau as "the gayest city in America". Provincetown, or Ptown, was also voted "Best Resort Town in 2011" by Gaycities.com. The town had far more gay marriages than straight marriages performed since 2003 when Massachusetts legalized same-sex marriage. The town's various businesses sponsor Gay Men's Week, Women's Week, Bear Week, Family Week (for same-sex families), and their version of a gay pride parade, Carnival. Famous gay residents currently include journalist Andrew Sullivan, filmmaker John Waters, and comedian Kate Clinton.

Some cities have a very well-defined gay village in the heart of a larger area that also has a significant gay population. One example of this phenomenon is Davie Village in the heart of Vancouver's gay community. It sits within the greater West End area, which, though decently populated by gay people, is not necessarily considered a gay village.

Boystown in Chicago is also a very well-defined gay village situated within the larger Lakeview neighborhood. Lakeview is an affluent neighborhood with a reputation for being a stronghold of liberal and progressive political views. Outside of Boystown, Lakeview is a mixture of both gay and straight citizens and families, but Boystown is the main gay village. Boystown began with a cluster of bars on North Halsted Street and blossomed into an entire district dedicted to LGBT life and culture in the 1980s. According to the founders of Sidetrack, one of these pioneering bars, Boystown was only to grow as much as it did because its residents were politically engaged and actively resisted city efforts to drive them underground. Gay bars in boystown also served as a hub of AIDS related activism.

Andersonville is another of Chicago's gay villages. It became known as "Girlstown" in the 1980s and 1990s following an influx of lesbian couples to the area. Residents attribute this initial migration to a well-loved feminist bookstore called Women and Children First moving to Andersonville after being priced out of Boystown. In the mid 2000s, more families and older people started moving into Boystown, and many gay men also made the move to Girlstown. In the last decade, the number of married gay men in Andersonville actually surpassed the number of married lesbians and many of the neighborhood's lesbian-centric business have closed. Still, Andersonville retains its historical significance for the lesbian community and its identity as a haven for LGBT people.

Despite its large gay population and higher concentration of gay venues, the South Beach area in Miami Beach, Florida, was never exclusively gay, because of its popularity among straight people alike. Philadelphia's traditional gay village comprises several downtown blocks and is called "the Gayborhood". The LGBT culture in Philadelphia has an established presence that includes clubs, bars, and restaurants as well as health facilities for the LGBT community. Philadelphia's "Gayborhood" contains 68 rainbow street sign signs throughout the community. Washington, D.C.'s Dupont Circle and Logan Circle area are known for its many gay oriented bars, restaurants, and shops. Dupont Circle is also known for its annual High Heel Drag Queen Race. The Short North in downtown Columbus, Ohio, is primarily known as an art district, but has a strong gay community and a high concentration of gay-oriented clubs and bars. In Boston, the trendy and upscale South End neighborhood has a large population of gay men, and the Jamaica Plain and Roslindale neighborhoods are home to scores of lesbians, also with vibrant but less trendy downtown areas.

Montreal's Gay Village (Le Village, in French) is considered one of North America's largest in population, concentration and scope.

San Diego has its own gay village called Hillcrest, which sits around Balboa Park. Hillcrest is very close to the downtown area but is able to maintain a small town eclectic feel. While it is considered by most as the gay area of San Diego with its gay bars and dance clubs, the overall population of the area has only gotten more and more diverse with the rise in condominium projects. Having been priced out of owning or renting in the Hillcrest area, the San Diego LGBT community has spread outward for miles into North Park, University Heights and dozens more neighborhoods. These diverse, welcoming areas have slowly continued the gentrifying process.

In Minneapolis, Minnesota, areas surrounding Loring Park, site of the local LGBT pride festival, are regarded as a "gay" neighborhood, though many gay and lesbian people have migrated to more residential neighborhoods such as Bryn Mawr and Whittier.

In Tampa, Florida, the gay community was traditionally spread out among several neighborhoods. In the early 21st century, the Ybor City National Historic Landmark District has seen the creation of the GaYbor District, which is now the center of gay and lesbian life in the Tampa Bay area and home to the majority of gay bars and dance clubs, restaurants, and service organizations. Across Tampa Bay in St. Petersburg, the LGBT community is centered around the Grand Central neighborhood near downtown. In Orlando, Florida, the gay community is centered around the neighborhoods of Thornton Park and Eola Heights.

Church and Wellesley is an LGBT-oriented community located in Toronto, Canada. It is roughly bounded by Gould Street to the south, Yonge Street to the west, Charles Street to the north, and Jarvis Street to the east, with the intersection of Church and Wellesley Streets at the centre of this area. Though some gay and lesbian oriented establishments can be found outside of this area, the general boundaries of this village have been defined by the Gay Toronto Tourism Guild. Many LGBT individuals also live in the nearby residential neighbourhoods of The Annex, Cabbagetown, St. James Town and Riverdale, and in smaller numbers throughout the city and its suburbs.

Ottawa established an LGBT-friendly village along Bank Street in Centretown on November 4, 2011, when the City of Ottawa installed six street signs at the intersections of Bank/Nepean, Bank/Somerset and Bank/James. This is the cap to an historic year and six years of lobbying, where the village installed two public art projects in addition to tripling the number of rainbow flags in the village area. The village in Ottawa features a diverse mix of businesses and organizations, many of which cater to or of specific interest to the LGBT community, and has a high concentration of LGBT persons living and working in the area.

Asbury Park, New Jersey, and the adjacent town of Ocean Grove, New Jersey, house large gay communities. Many vacationers who visit Asbury Park are gay, and the city houses New Jersey's only gay hotel, The Empress Hotel. Collingswood, New Jersey, a suburb of Philadelphia, also houses a prominent year-round gay community. Ogunquit, Maine, has a gay population of year-round residents and second homeowners.

Europe 
The neighbourhood of Le Marais in Paris has experienced a growing gay presence since the 1980s, as evidenced by the existence of a large gay community and of many gay cafés, nightclubs, cabarets and shops, such as one of the largest gay clubs in Europe, Le Depot. These establishments are mainly concentrated in the southwestern portion of the Marais, many on or near the streets Sainte-Croix de la Bretonnerie and Vieille du Temple.

A well-known gay village of Sitges is one of the richest residential areas within the area of greater Barcelona. The town hosts several gay events throughout the year, such as Gay Pride and Bears Week. The first monument for the gay community, an inverse triangle, was built in Passeig Maritim street in 2006. Many gay tourists use the gay-friendly accommodation in Sitges during Circuit Festival of Barcelona.

Not all major cities have gay villages, especially those with more progressive histories with LGBT rights. Sweden, for example, legalized same sexual activity in 1944, a full 67 years before Lawrence vs. Texas decriminalized homosexuality in the US. As a result, there was not the same need for secret gathering places in Swedish cities that shaped many gay villages elsewhere. However, there are areas which were historically known as meeting places for gays, such as Södermalm in Stockholm, Punavuori and Kallio in Helsinki, which remain as somewhat trendy areas for gay people to live in, though they do not have a predominantly gay population.

Australia 
In Sydney, New South Wales, Potts Point (aka "Poofs Point") and nearby Elizabeth Bay (aka "Betty Bay") are renowned for having the largest gay population in the city, with many gay run business. The area is known for having the highest density of population in Australia with many Art Deco apartment blocks. Newtown also has a sizable gay population but it has a more gritty bohemian feel. Darlinghurst is also a historically gay area. Oxford Street in particular is known as the Golden Mile due to its long stretch of LGBT bars and clubs.

In Melbourne, Victoria, city fringe suburbs such as Collingwood and South Yarra have sizeable gay communities. Big 7 Travel ranked Melbourne as the fourth most LGBT friendly city in the world.

Asia 
In Pattaya, Thailand, Boyztown is a hub of gay nightlife and entertainment that is especially popular with European and Chinese tourists. Since its peak in the 1990s and early 2000s, rising prices and COVID policies have caused Boyztown to lose some of its business. At the peak of its popularity, Boyztown drew in funding for AIDS-related charity organizations through grand events like the Pattaya Gay Festival.

Shinjuku Ni-chōme, Tokyo's gay village, boasts the world's highest density of gay and lesbian bars, many of which are very small and highly curated to a particular scene. Some are intended for foreign tourists, while others give priority to regulars and court a certain subset of the local LGBT community, such as butch lesbians or the BDSM community. Ni-chōme is also home to Japan's first LGBT center, Pride House Toyko Legacy. Like Pattaya's Boyztown, Nichō's business suffered during the pandemic, but it is slowly bouncing back to its former glory.

South America 
Bogota, Colombia has a prominent gay village called the Chapinero. The locus of the Chapinero's LGBT culture is one of the most famous gay nightclubs in the world, Theatron, which opened in the 1990s. Before Theatron, the Chapinero had a vibrant drag ball scene that drew crowds from neighboring South American countries.

UK gay villages
Bigger cities and metropolitan areas are most popular as they are deemed to be more tolerant and tend to have "a history of progressive local government policy towards supporting and financing LGBTQ-friendly initiatives." There is also a noted circular pattern of migration, whereby once areas have established a reputation as somewhere LGBT people live, more LGBT people are drawn there. LGBT-inclusive areas of UK towns and cities tend to be defined by "a distinct geographic focal point, a unique culture, a cluster of commercial spaces" and sometimes a concentration of residences. It is thought that LGBT-inclusive areas help towns and cities in the UK to prosper economically, but some believe the building of such areas creates an isolating effect on some LGBT people who want to blend in.

Pride festivals
Both Birmingham Pride and Liverpool Pride are huge annual festivals which attract tens of thousands of people to their respective cities in August each year. Birmingham Pride is centred on the city's gay village located around Hurst Street, whilst Liverpool's Pride is spread across the Liverpool gay quarter and the Pier Head.

Brighton

Brighton is generally agreed to be the unofficial "gay capital" of the UK, and records LGBT history in the city since the 19th century. Brighton Pride is the largest Pride event in the UK, celebrated at the start of August and attracting around 160,000 people every year. Many LGBT pubs, clubs, bars, restaurants, cafés and shops are located around Brighton and in particular around St James's Street in Kemptown. Several LGBT charities, social and support groups are also based in the city, including the Allsorts Youth Project, the Brighton Gay and Lesbian Switchboard and the Brighton Gay Men's Chorus. GScene magazine, the LGBT magazine for the city, is published every month. In a 2014 estimate, 11–15% of the city's population aged 16 or over is thought to be lesbian, gay or bisexual. The city also had the highest percentage of same-sex households in the UK in 2004 and the largest number of civil partnership registrations outside of London in 2013.

London

London's LGBT community has historically been centred around Soho since the 18th century, and Old Compton Street in particular, where bars, clubs, restaurants, cafés, shops and theatres now line the streets. Vauxhall, known colloquially as Voho, is also popular, which homes bars, nightclubs and a sauna as well as the historic Royal Vauxhall Tavern and Above The Stag Theatre, the UK's only LGBT theatre. Recently, venues in Dalston, Shoreditch and Bethnal Green have become popular with the LGBT community. The Gay Liberation Front in the UK started in London in the 1970s, which spawned the first official UK Gay Pride Rally in the city in 1972. London's Pride festival is now celebrated across the centre of city at the end of June, with particular focus on the main stage at Trafalgar Square and venues in Soho and Vauxhall. Pride is an annual event that closes London's Oxford Street and draws the largest numbers of spectators in the country each year. In 2014, more than 750,000 people attended London Pride. This number reportedly grew to an estimated 1.5 million in 2019, making it the biggest Pride yet. London is also home to UK Black Pride. In an Office for National Statistics survey in 2010, London was found to be home to the highest percentage of British people who identify as either gay, lesbian or bisexual than anywhere else in the UK at 2.5%. LGBT organisations in the city include the London Lesbian and Gay Switchboard and OutRage!. Stonewall, founded in 1989, is now the UK's biggest LGBT charity and is based in London. HIV/AIDS charities Terrence Higgins Trust and National AIDS Trust are also based in London as well as PinkNews, a popular LGBT online newspaper. National LGBT magazines Gay Times, Attitude and DIVA are also based in the city, as are publications QX, Boyz, So So Gay, and Out in the City, which are distributed exclusively in the capital.

Manchester

Canal Street has been the centre of Manchester's Gay Village since the 1960s. Manchester Pride, held every year in the village at the end of August, started from humble beginnings in the 1980s to achieving tens of thousands of spectators in the ensuing years. Manchester's Gay Village has been named one of the "most successful gay villages in Europe" and the "gay capital of the north," a reputation enhanced by LGBT TV shows Bob & Rose and Queer as Folk, both written by Russell T Davies, which were set there. Cucumber/Banana, also by Davies, was also set there. The LGBT Foundation charity is based in Manchester as is the Albert Kennedy Trust, which started in the city and branched out to London and Newcastle. The UK's longest-running bisexual community organisation, BiPhoria, is also based in the city. The city of Manchester is estimated to be home to between 24,950 and 34,930 lesbian, gay and bisexual people.

Birmingham
Birmingham is home to 60,000 gay people. The Birmingham Gay Village, which became prominent in the 1990s, is located around Hurst Street in Southside and features clubs, bars and shops. Birmingham Pride is celebrated each year around the late May bank holiday weekend; its entertainment and festivities are centred around the Gay Village. Organisers estimated that Pride brings around £15 million to the city's economy. In 2014, it attracted over 50,000 people. The city also has its own LGBT centre, opened in 2013, for support with health and well being. Midlands Zone, the LGBT magazine for the region, is published every month.

Leicester, Nottingham, Stoke
The Midlands cities of Nottingham, Leicester and Stoke-on-Trent have big LGBT communities and all host Pride events. Nottingham Pride, Leicester Pride and Stoke-on-Trent Pride are all attended by thousands.

Liverpool

 
Liverpool is home to the largest LGBT population in the UK, with an estimated 94,000 LGBT people living in the city, equivalent to the LGBT population of San Francisco. Liverpool is also the first and only British city to officially recognise its gay quarter Stanley Street Quarter, installing street signs bearing the rainbow-coloured Pride flag to identify it in 2011 on Stanley Street, Cumberland Street, Temple Lane, Eberle Street and Temple Street. Liverpool Pride was established in 2010 and draws tens of thousands each year. The city's annual Homotopia festival is run by the only lesbian, gay, bisexual, trans and queer combined arts organisation in northern England. Liverpool was also the scene of many significant moments in the history of the gay rights movement (see LGBT culture in Liverpool).

Leeds and Sheffield
Leeds's large gay district is centred around Leeds Bridge and Lower Briggate in The Calls. Leeds Pride is the most popular Pride event in Yorkshire, bringing approximately 25,000 people to the city each year, with other Prides in the region taking place in Sheffield and York. Sheffield is reportedly home to between 27,635 and 38,689 lesbian, gay and bisexual people and 3,300 trans people. Since the 1990s the Yorkshire market town of Hebden Bridge has been branded "the lesbian capital of the UK", and is reported to have the highest number of lesbians per capita than anywhere else in the UK.

In 2018, Sheffield had its first "gay quarter" established. Located on the corner of The Moor and Hereford Street in the city centre, it takes in the long-established Dempsey's bar and club, the newly opened Queer Junction and in the imminent future, another gay bar, sauna and shop will open on the same block. The 2018 LGBTQ+ Pride which took place in the city has also been reportedly the busiest alongside celebrating its 10th anniversary.

Bristol
Old Market was declared the main gay village in Bristol, with its scene centred on West Street. Across the city centre, Frogmore Street in the Old City is considered the Bristol Gay Central. Queenshilling first opened here in 1992, although the first post-1967 gay club to open in Bristol was the Moulin Rouge on Worrall Road, Clifton, in 1970. The city's first Pride took place in 1977 as a fundraiser. Some unofficial celebrations took place in the 2000s until Bristol Pride was re-established in 2010.

LGBT populations

Top LGBT populations in Brazilian cities

In 2009, a survey conducted by the University of São Paulo in 10 Brazilian state capitals estimated that 7.8% of Brazil's male population was gay and 2.6% was bisexual (a total of 10.4%), while 4.9% of the female population was estimated to be lesbian and 1.4% bisexual (a total of 6.3%).

In the city of Rio de Janeiro, 19.3% of the male population was estimated to be gay or bisexual. Among the female population in the city of Manaus, 10.2% were estimated to be lesbian or bisexual.

Top LGBT populations in the US
An estimated 33 to 50 percent of Palm Springs, California, are gay male or other parts of the LGBT community; this statistic makes them the largest percentage community in the US.

The following charts show a list of the top US cities, states, and metro areas with:

 the highest population of gay residents, and
 the highest percentage of gay residents within city limits. (LGBT population as a percentage of total residents). The numbers given are estimates based on American Community Survey. The US Census does not ask for sexual orientation or gender identity.

Population

See also

 Ethnic enclave
 Homosocialization
 Lesbian bar
 LGBT tourism
 Gay villages in the UK

Notes

References
 
 Castells, Manuel 1983. The City and the Grassroots: A Cross-Cultural Theory of Urban Social Movements. Berkeley, Los Angeles: University of California Press.
 D'Emilio, John 1992. Making Trouble: Essays on Gay History, Politics, and the University. New York, London: Routledge.
 Escoffier, Jeffrey 1998. American Homo: Community and Perversity. Berkeley, Los Angeles, London: University of California Press.
 Florida, Richard 2002. The Rise of the Creative Class: And How It's Transforming Work, Leisure, Community and Everyday Life. New York: Perseus Books Group.
 
 Kenney, Moira Rachel 1998. "Remember, Stonewall was a Riot: Understanding Gay and Lesbian Experience in the City" Chapter 5, pp. 120–132 in: Leoni Sandercock (ed) Making the Invisible Visible. Berkeley, Los Angeles, London: University of California Press.
 
 Levine, Martin P. 1979. "Gay Ghetto" pp. 182–204 in: Martin Levine (ed) Gay Men: The Sociology of Male Homosexuality. New York, Hagerstown, San Francisco, London: Harper & Row.
 Ray, Brian and Damaris Rose 2000. "Cities of the Everyday: Socio-Spatial Perspectives on Gender, Difference, and Diversity" pp. 507–512 in: Trudi Bunting and Pierre Filion (eds). Canadian Cities in Transition: The Twenty-First Century. 2nd ed. Oxford: Oxford University Press.

External links

 Memoir and history of gay Upper West Side in Manhattan, NYC
 Counting Gay New York (Gotham Gazette, July 2001)
 NYC LGBT Historical Sites Project